Shumakov is a rural locality (a khutor) in Brezhnevsky Selsoviet Rural Settlement, Kursky District, Kursk Oblast, Russia. Population:

Geography 
The khutor is located on the Malaya Kuritsa River (a right tributary of the Bolshaya Kuritsa River in the Seym River basin), 87 km from the Russia–Ukraine border, 18 km north-west of Kursk, 6.5 km from the selsoviet center – Verkhnekasinovo.

 Climate
Shumakov has a warm-summer humid continental climate (Dfb in the Köppen climate classification).

Transport 
Shumakov is located 8.5 km from the federal route  Crimea Highway (a part of the European route ), 1.5 km from the road of intermunicipal significance  ("Crimea Highway" – Verkhnyaya Medveditsa – Razinkovo), 20 km from the nearest railway station Kursk (railway lines: Oryol – Kursk, Kursk – 146 km and Lgov-I – Kursk).

The rural locality is situated 23 km from Kursk Vostochny Airport, 136 km from Belgorod International Airport and 225 km from Voronezh Peter the Great Airport.

References

Notes

Sources

Rural localities in Kursky District, Kursk Oblast